Jason O'Halloran (born 30 December 1987 in Wollongong) is an Australian motorcycle racer. He races in the British Superbike Championship aboard a Yamaha YZF-R1.

O'Halloran's nickname is the O'Show, a name originally applied to 1980s American motocrosser Johnny O'Mara.

He was the Australian Supersport champion in 2007.

Career statistics

Supersport World Championship

Races by year
(key)

Grand Prix motorcycle racing

By season

Races by year
(key)

Superbike World Championship

Races by year

 * Season still in progress.

British Superbike Championship

Races by Year

References

External links

Living people
1987 births
Australian motorcycle racers
Moto2 World Championship riders
Supersport World Championship riders
British Superbike Championship riders
Superbike World Championship riders